The Grasmere Schoolhouse No. 9 and Town Hall, also known as the Grasmere Grange Hall, is a historic municipal building located at 87 Center Street in the village of Grasmere in Goffstown, New Hampshire. Built in 1889 as a town hall and school, it has served a variety of civic and community functions since its construction, and is a good example of civic Queen Anne architecture. It was listed on the National Register of Historic Places in 1990.

Description
The Grasmere Schoolhouse No. 9 and Town Hall is located on the north side of Center Street, a short way east of Grasmere's main intersection with Henry Bridge Road. It is a 2½-story wood-frame structure, with a clipped gable roof and clapboarded exterior. A two-story pavilion projects from the center of the street-facing long side, with a hip roof topped by a square tower. The tower has an open belvedere with round-arch openings, and is capped by a pyramidal roof. The main entrance is in the base of the pavilion, recessed in three round-arch openings under a single-story gable.

History
Designed by W.W. Ireland in the Queen Anne style of architecture, it was built as a dual-function public building in 1889 on the site of a 1700s religious and governmental building. Over the years it has also been used by many local groups, including the now defunct Junior Grange No. 150, which was organized in 1890.

Although no longer used today for its two original uses, it is still used for some public purposes such as the Goffstown Municipal Court and other local governmental agencies. Current private uses include the Merri-Loo Community Preschool, which leases part of the ground floor, and the Jaycees.

See also
National Register of Historic Places listings in Hillsborough County, New Hampshire

References

Queen Anne architecture in New Hampshire
Buildings and structures in Hillsborough County, New Hampshire
Grange organizations and buildings in New Hampshire
Schools in New Hampshire
City and town halls in New Hampshire
Courthouses in New Hampshire
School buildings completed in 1889
School buildings on the National Register of Historic Places in New Hampshire
City and town halls on the National Register of Historic Places in New Hampshire
Goffstown, New Hampshire
National Register of Historic Places in Hillsborough County, New Hampshire